In knitting, a gather draws stitches closer together within a row of knitting.  Common methods include:

 In binding, a yarn loop is passed over 2 or more stitches in the same row (usually adjacent to the binding loop); also known as a pullover stitch.
 In clustering, the yarn is wound laterally around a set of stitches in the same row, possibly several times; also known as a wrap stitch.
 Smocking is a sewing or embroidery technique in which the tiny pleats are drawn together with thread or yarn.  Before the development of elastic, smocking was used to provide a stretchable, flexible panel of fabric.

Related techniques

In the sewing technique ruching (pronounced ,  also spelled rouching), a large number of increases are introduced in one row, which are then removed by decreases a few rows later.  This produces many small vertical ripples or "ruches" in the fabric, effectively little pleats.  The technique of shirring produces a similar effect by gathering the fabric in two parallel rows (not necessarily horizontal), usually by smocking.

References

Knitting methods for shaping

ru:Рюш